Ngõ 224 Lê Duẩn  is a narrow alley in Hanoi’s Old Quarter, known as “The Train Street”, which sees a twice-daily speeding train pass close to buildings on either side of the tracks (the railroad tracks take up nearly the entirety of the “train street”).  The track was built by the French in 1902 and is still an active rail line as of 2023. 

The train passes at 3pm and 7pm daily, on the rail line between Hanoi and Ho Chi Minh City in the south.  The alley is so narrow that local residents must remove their personal belongings, including bicycles and children, before the train passes. Locals often sit on the tracks, drinking tea and playing checkers. 
The street has become a popular tourist stop in Hanoi, but was closed to tourists by local authorities in October 2019 for security reasons, fearing a severe accident. Tourists would often stop and take pictures to post on social media along the narrow alley. In more recent times, the street was home to squatters and drug addicts amongst numerous cafes and residential buildings.  The overcrowded street caused the need to reroute a local train on October 6, 2019, prompting the closure. Local cafes have sprung up to serve the bustling tourist trade along the street and owners are concerned over the loss of business the closure will bring.  The VN Express newspaper cites a train driver that has had three close calls with tourists on the tracks, once only stopping only meters from the woman who was taking pictures of the train. 

Tourists can safely watch the train from the outdoor seating areas of the local cafes; owners will typically move their stools closer to the wall and advise patrons to do so as the train approaches. Many will also post train times on chalk boards in their establishments.

References

Streets in Hanoi
Culture of Hanoi